The Battle of Memmingen was a battle at Memmingen during the 1805 German campaign of the Napoleonic Wars. It occurred on 14 October that year and culminated in the surrender of Karl Spangen to Nicolas Soult's 4th Army Corps.

Course
After the crossing of the Danube on 7 October at the battle of Donauwörth, the Grande Armée manoeuvred to the east of Ulm to cut off Karl Mack's force from Mikhail Kutuzov's Russian force to the east and Archduke John's Austrian force to the south. While Michel Ney and Jean Lannes re-crossed the Danube at the battle of Elchingen to cut off the line of advance to Moravia, Soult headed towards Memmingen to cut off the route to the Tyrol.

By 14 October Soult and his 25,440 men and 51 cannon were in place, setting up an artillery bombardment of the town and sending two letters to its governor, Karl Spangen. Spangen believed that the French would carry out their threat to bombard the city and surrendered himself and his 4,500 men and 9 cannon, for a loss of only 16 of Soult's men. After Memmingen was captured, Ulm was completely surrounded on its right bank. Soult's corps was able to stop all Austrian attempts to unite the armies of Ulm and Tyrol, dispersing an Austrian column between Leutkirch and Wurzbach on 19 October.

Notes

References

External links
 

Battles involving Austria
Sieges of the Napoleonic Wars
Battles of the War of the Third Coalition
Conflicts in 1805
October 1805 events